Kambala (or Kambla/Kambula) is an annual buffalo race held in the southwestern Indian state of Karnataka. Traditionally, it is sponsored by local Tuluva landlords and households in the coastal districts of Dakshina Kannada and Udupi of Karnataka and Kasaragod of Kerala, a region collectively known as Tulu Nadu.

The Kambala season generally starts in November and lasts until March. The Kambalas are organized through Kambala samithis (Kambala Associations), of which there are currently 18. Over 45 races are held annually in coastal Karnataka, including smaller remote villages such as Vandaru and Gulvadi.

Etymology
Kambala is derived from 'kampa-kala', where the word 'Kampa' is related slushy, muddy field. The Dravidian origin of the word Kampa is kan+pa and 'kala' means field, where it is conducted. Another interpretation of modern Kambala is derived from 'Kamba', a pole used for water spurt during race by buffalo pairs.

Format 

Kambala is a sport. The Kambala racetrack is a slushy paddy field, and the buffaloes are driven by a whip-lashing farmer.

Traditional Kambala was non-competitive, and the pair was run one by one. In modern Kambala, the contest generally takes place between two pairs of buffaloes. In villages such as Vandaro and Choradi, there is also a ritualistic aspect, as farmers race their buffaloes to give thanks for protecting them from diseases.

Historically, the winning pair of buffaloes was rewarded with coconuts and bananas. Today, winning owners earn gold and silver coins. Some organising committees award an eight-gram gold coin to the winner. In some competitions, cash prizes are awarded.

Decoration of Buffalo
The buffaloes are decorated with coloured jhūls and head-pieces made of brass and silver (sometimes bearing the emblems of the sun and moon), and ropes which make a sort of bridle. The special towel used to cover the buffalo's back is called the paavade (Tulu:ಪಾವಡೆ).

Types of Kambalas
Traditionally, there were types of Kambalas
Pookere Kambala
Baare Kambla
Kori Kambala
Arasu Kambla  
Devere Kambla
Baale Kambala

Kori Kambla
Kori Kambla is a distinct agriculture-based celebration in Tulunadu. This refers to a kind of collective ploughing and planting on a fixed day for the enelu (Tulu: ಏಣೆಲ್) cultivation. A general race of buffaloes is known as kori (kandoe korune)[1] Kambala.

Bale Kambla
The celebration of Bale Kambala was discontinued about 900 years ago. Bale means baby. During Small kambala, the small-scale  farmers prepare their field for paddy cultivation.

Natha Pantha
The kambla influenced by Natha pantha, in earlier days, the Kambla starts previous day evening with tradition dance of Koraga communities mostly by men. They performing full night with following all Panchamakara madya (Alcohol), māṃsa (Meat), matsya (Fish), mudrā (Gesture), maithuna (Sexual). The Koragas were sit up through the night before the Kambla day, performing a ceremony called panikkuluni, the meaning of word sitting under the dew. They sing songs to the accompaniment of their special kind of band dudi, about their special spirit daiva Nīcha, and offer toddy and a rice-pudding boiled in a large earthen pot, which is broken so that the pudding remains as a solid mass. This pudding is called kandēl addyē, or pot pudding.

Innovations
Kambala has become an organised rural sport, with elaborate planning and scheduling to accommodate competitions at different places. A "Kambala Committee" arranges races in several categories describing the outfitting of the buffaloes. Typical categories are:
Nāyer(ನಾಯೆರ್): The runner have hold kind of special plough, it is not an actual plough which is heavy and bulky made by wood or iron, it is just a representation that is tied to a pair of buffalo. This type is mostly for the junior buffaloes or entry-level buffaloes. In the competition there are junior and senior rounds in this race.
Bal (ಹಗ್ಗ: rope),  A rope is directly tied to the buffalo pair. And this is for senior buffaloes as the speed is greater here and the participating buffaloes are well experienced. Runner running aside of buffalo holding knots in the rope. This has junior and senior levels.
Aḍḍa palāyi (ಅಡ್ಡ ಪಲಾಯಿ: cross wooden block),A  cross wooden plank is tied to the pair and the runner  stands on it while racing. The wooden plank horizontally placed to muddy water, the runner stands on the plank.  This is just  for the senior category.
Kaṇe palāyi (ಕಣೆ  ಪಲಾಯಿ: round wooden block),  a special made round wooden block where the runner  stands on it on his single leg. There will special techniques with two holes in the block of wooden, which act like orifice,  out of which the water forces out while running. The height of the water forcing out is measured to choose the winner. The more the speed is more the water height is. It would be 6 kolu or 7 Kolu there will a horizontal white cotton flag is installed so the general people judge the winner by eyewitness. Commonly it is called Nishaneg Neer Padune and this is only for senior most category.

Kambala draws large rural crowds, as it has done for the last three hundred years. People bet on the buffaloes, and one can witness more than 20,000 spectators in a well-organised Kambala, egging on and cheering the buffaloes to complete the race.

In some places, night races are arranged under floodlights.

The buffaloes developed for the race are carefully fed and some owners have even built separate swimming pools for competing buffaloes.

Kadri Kambala

Kadri Kambala used to be held at Kadri, Mangalore and it is called Dēvere Kambla (God's Kambala) as it is associated with Sri Manjunatha Temple in that city. This event was patronised by the Alupa kings of Mangalore, 300 years ago. For this reason, Kadri Kambala is also known as Arasu Kambala (King's Kambala).

Legal status
Many have criticised Kambala as cruel to the racing buffaloes, which are driven by whips. Noted animal-rights activist Maneka Gandhi expressed concerns about the ill treatment of buffaloes during the race. While Kambala organizers contend that whips are necessary to elicit maximum speed, government officials advise the riders to be gentle on buffaloes and avoid using whips during the race.

In 2014, based on lawsuits filed by animal welfare organizations, the Supreme Court of India ordered a ban on Kambala. The ban also covered Jallikattu, a sport of hands-on bull taming. A government order lifted the ban on Jallikattu in January 2017, and the public asked for the ban on Kambala to be lifted, too.

The Prevention of Cruelty to Animals (Karnataka Amendment) Ordinance, 2017 re-legalized the Kambala festival in Karnataka. Then-President of India, Pranab Mukherjee, promulgated the new law on 3 July 2017. Litigation continued but was resolved by the passage of the Prevention of Cruelty to Animals (Karnataka Amendment) Bill, 2018, which then-President Ram Nath Kovind approved on 19 February 2018.

However, after the relegalization, it was found that the buffaloes were still being whipped during the race.

Schedule

See also 
 Pacu jawi, a similar type of race held in Tanah Datar, West Sumatra, Indonesia. 
 Sport in India - overview of sport
 Jallikattu - Traditional man- bullfight in Tamilnadu 
 Pola race - Annual Bull racing in Maharashtra on Pola festival day
 Flying duck race (pacu itiak) in Payakumbuh, West Sumatra
 Karapan sapi, chariot-style bull racing in Madura, Indonesia

References

External links

 Specialities -> Kambala
 More about Kambala
 A photo documentary on Kambala
 Modbidri Kambala

Bunt (community)
Culture of Mangalore
Animal racing
Cruelty to animals
Dakshina Kannada district
Culture of Tulu Nadu
Water buffalo
Animal rights